Dabiživ is an old Serbian male given name, derived from the sentence da bi bio živ ("to be alive"), documented since the Middle Ages. The female form is Dabiživa. It may refer to:

Dabiživ Spandulj, (fl. 1375–76), kefalija ("chief") of Strumica
Dabiživ Čihorić (fl. 1345), nobleman serving Stefan Dušan in Trebinje
Dabiživ Nenčić (fl. 1383–99), župan, son of Nenac and Radača, mentioned as a neighbour to the Ragusans
Dabiživ, a son of Jovan Oliver

See also
Dabiša

Serbian masculine given names
Slavic masculine given names